S.H. Rider High School is a public school in Wichita Falls, Texas, United States. It is part of the Wichita Falls Independent School District. The school opened in 1961 and serves students in grades nine through twelve.

History 
The school opened for classes in the fall of 1961. It was named for Stephen H. Rider, a long-time educator in the Wichita Falls Independent School District.  He was principal of Wichita Falls High School from 1919 to 1949.

Although Rider did not open until seven years after the U.S. Supreme Court's Brown v. Board of Education decision, none of Wichita Falls's high schools integrated their classes until the late 1960s.

Demographics 
In the 2016–2017 academic year, 59.3% of Rider's graduates were white, 22.3% were Hispanic, 9.8% were African American, 4.3% were Asian, 1.6% were American Indian, 0.3% were Pacific Islander, and 2.4% were multiracial.

Academics 
During the 2016–2017 school year, 8.2% of Rider students were in the school's gifted and talented education program.  Another 10.4% of Rider students were in the school's special education program.

In 2016, the Texas Education Agency (TEA) gave Rider an academic accountability ratting of "Met standard".  In 2018, the TEA began grading schools in five key areas of performance.  In 2017, four "preliminary" grades were given to Rider: a B, two Cs, and a D.

Extracurricular activities

Sports 

In 1970, Wichita Falls Independent School District built Memorial Stadium, the first high school stadium in Texas with AstroTurf.  Seating capacity is over 14,500.

Notable alumni 
Chase Anderson, MLB pitcher
J. T. Barrett, NFL quarterback
Ryan Brasier, MLB pitcher
Joe Cutbirth, journalist and educator
James Frank, member of the Texas House of Representatives from District 69 in Wichita Falls 
Ty Harrelson, NBA guard and college coach
Khari Long, UFL and NFL defensive end
Markelle Martin, NFL safety
David Nelson, NFL wide receiver
Dean Prater, NFL defensive end
Steve Railsback, actor
Jaret Reddick, lead singer, guitarist for Bowling For Soup
Mark Satin, anti-Vietnam War activist, political theorist, and author
Aaron Taylor,  NFL offensive guard
Eric Ward, NFL wide receiver
Ronnie Williams, NFL tight end

References

External links
 Rider High School – official site 
 Wichita Falls Independent School District – official site

Schools in Wichita County, Texas
High schools in Wichita Falls, Texas
Public high schools in Texas
Educational institutions established in 1961
1961 establishments in Texas